Lilia Reyes Morales  is a Mexican politician affiliated with the Institutional Revolutionary Party. As of 2014 she served briefly as Senator of the LIX Legislature of the Mexican Congress representing Hidalgo as replacement of José Ernesto Gil Elorduy and as Deputy of the LVII Legislature.

References

Date of birth unknown
Living people
Politicians from Hidalgo (state)
Women members of the Senate of the Republic (Mexico)
Members of the Senate of the Republic (Mexico)
Members of the Chamber of Deputies (Mexico)
Institutional Revolutionary Party politicians
Women members of the Chamber of Deputies (Mexico)
Year of birth missing (living people)